Eustorgius or Eustorge can refer to:

Eustorgius I, bishop of Milan from 344 to 350
Eustorgius II, bishop of Milan from 512 to 518
Eustorge de Scorailles, bishop of Limoges from 1106 until 1137
Eustorgius of Nicomedia, father of Saint Pantaleon
Eustorgius of Montaigu, archbishop of Nicosia in the 13th century

See also
Basilica of Sant'Eustorgio